Red Star Over China is a 1937 book by Edgar Snow. It is an account of the Chinese Communist Party (CCP) that was written when it was a guerrilla army and still obscure to Westerners.

Along with Pearl S. Buck's The Good Earth (1931), it was the most influential book on Western understanding of China as well as the most influential book on Western sympathy for Red China in the 1930s.

Overview 
In Red Star Over China, Edgar Snow recounts the months that he spent with the Chinese Red Army in 1936. Most of this time, he was at their then-capital Bao'an (Pao An).  They moved to the famous Yan'an only after he left.

Snow uses his extensive interviews with Mao and the other top leaders to present vivid descriptions of the Long March, as well as biographical accounts of leaders on both sides of the conflicts, including Zhou Enlai, Peng Dehuai, Lin Biao, He Long,  and Mao Zedong's own account of his life.

When Snow wrote, there were no reliable reports reaching the West about what was going on in the communist-controlled areas. Other writers, such as Agnes Smedley, had written in some detail about the Chinese Communists before the Long March, but none of these writers had ever visited them or even conducted first hand interviews with them. Snow's status as an international journalist not previously identified with the communist movement gave his reports the stamp of authenticity. The glowing pictures of life in the communist areas contrasted with the gloom and corruption of the Kuomintang government. Many Chinese learned about Mao and the communist movement from the almost immediate translations of Mao's autobiography, and readers in North America and Europe, especially those with liberal views, were heartened to learn of a movement which they interpreted as being anti-fascist and progressive. Snow reported the new Second United Front which Mao said would leave violent class struggle behind.

Snow made it clear that Mao's ultimate aim was control of China. Only by taking Snow's thoughts out of context, concluded one scholar, was it possible for Harold Isaacs to claim that Red Star Over China was the origin of the myth that the Chinese Communists were "agrarian reformers."

Snow's Preface to the revised edition in 1968 describes the book's original context:

The Western powers, in self-interest, were hoping for a miracle in China.  They dreamed of a new birth of nationalism that would keep Japan so bogged down that she would never be able to turn upon the Western colonies—her true objective.  Red Star Over China tended to show that the Chinese Communists could indeed provide that nationalist leadership needed for effective anti-Japanese resistance.  How dramatically the United States' policy-making attitudes have altered since then [...]

It provided not only for non-Chinese readers, but also for the entire Chinese people—including all but the Communist leaders themselves—the first authentic account of the Chinese Communist Party and the first connected story of their long struggle to carry through the most thoroughgoing social revolution in China's three millenniums of history.  Many editions were published in China ...

Publishing history 

Snow was not available to read proofs of the initial London and New York editions, but he revised the text of the 1939 and 1944 editions. The Publisher's Note of the 1939 edition explains that Snow added a "substantial new section" of six chapters to include the Xi'an Incident, bringing the narrative up to July 1938 as well as "many textual changes." Snow made the textual changes partly to polish but he also responded to friends and reviewers. Some of them felt Snow's account of party history had been too critical of Soviet policy, and others felt that he had given too much credit to Mao for independent Chinese strategies. Snow toned down but did not remove the implicit criticisms of Stalin. The 1944 edition was allowed to go out of print in the 1950s, but Snow made substantial revisions and annotations for the Grove Press reprint of 1968.

Edgar Snow, Red Star over China London: Left Book Club, Victor Gollancz, 1937; this edition reprinted as Red Star Over China – The Rise of the Red Army.  (2006).

--, (New York: Random House, 1938). Some changes from the London edition.

--, (Garden City, 1939) "Revised", with six extra chapters.

--, (New York: Modern Library, 1944).

--, (New York: Grove, 1968) Extensive revisions, with notes and annotations added.

Assessments and criticisms 
The book has been called a "journalistic scoop" and a "historical classic", and the scholar Julia Lovell is among those who argue that the book played a key role in creating Chinese support and Western approval of Mao. Indeed, Mao commented that the book "had merit no less than Great Yu controlling the floods." According to Jung Chang and Jon Halliday, Snow probably believed what he was told to be true, and much of it is still of basic significance, especially the "Autobiography of Mao". They also wrote that Mao omitted key elements from his accounts of party history and Snow missed others. According to Anne-Marie Brady, Snow submitted the transcripts of his interviews to be edited and approved by Party officials and changes in the American edition were made in response to the Communist Party of the United States. Snow's account of the Long March has been criticised by some while others have maintained that it is basically valid.

In his 1966 biography of Mao, the American Sinologist Stuart R. Schram wrote that Red Star Over China was irreplaceable in learning about Mao's early years and that despite "many errors of detail", it remains "by far the most important single source regarding his life" and offered important insights into "Mao's own vision of his past".  John K. Fairbank praised Snow's reporting for giving the West the first articulate account of the Chinese Communist Party and its leadership, which he called "disastrously prophetic." Writing thirty years after the first publication of Red Star Over China, Fairbank stated that the book had "stood the test of time... both as a historical record and as an indication of a trend." Fairbank agrees that Snow was used by Mao, but defended Snow against the allegation that he was blinded by Chinese hospitality and charm, insisting that "Snow did what he could as a professional journalist." In Mao: A Reinterpretation, a work sympathetic to Mao, Lee Feigon criticizes Snow's account for its inaccuracies, but praises Red Star for being "[the] seminal portrait of Mao" and relies on Snow's work as a critical reference throughout the book.

See also 
 Anna Louise Strong
 Dwarkanath Kotnis
 Jack Belden
 Norman Bethune
 Rewi Alley
 Helen Foster Snow

Footnotes

References

External links 
   
 Behind Red Star over China (2006 account from China Daily)
 There has also been a Chinese screen adaptation , which was however rejected by Edgar Snow's widow .
 Georgi Dimitrov and the Chinese Revolution

1937 non-fiction books
20th-century history books
American biographies
Books about China
Books about communism
Books about Mao Zedong
History books about China
History books about communism